Grégory Levasseur (born 1979 in Douarnenez, France) is a French screenwriter and film producer, best known for The Hills Have Eyes (2006), High Tension (2003), Maniac (2012)  Piranha 3-D (2010), Mirrors (2008),  P2 (2007), and Furia (1999), all of which he collaborated on with Alexandre Aja.

The Pyramid (2014) was Levasseur's directorial debut.

Filmography

References

External links
 

1979 births
Living people
Place of birth missing (living people)
French film directors
French film producers